Álvaro Manuel Santos Rosa Silva (born 21 April 1965) is a Portuguese sprinter. He competed in the 4 × 400 metres relay at the 1988 Summer Olympics and the 1992 Summer Olympics.

References

External links
 

1965 births
Living people
Athletes (track and field) at the 1988 Summer Olympics
Athletes (track and field) at the 1992 Summer Olympics
Portuguese male sprinters
Portuguese male middle-distance runners
Olympic athletes of Portugal
Athletes from Lisbon